Lobo is a surname found in the Galician, Spanish and Portuguese languages meaning "wolf", and in other languages with other meanings. Notable people with the surname include:

 Almiro Lobo (born 1982), known as Miro, Mozambican football defender
 Alonso Lobo (1555–1617), Spanish composer of the late Renaissance
 Amberley Lobo (born 1990), Australian television presenter
 Anthony Theodore Lobo (born 1937), Pakistani Roman Catholic bishop
 António Lobo de Almada Negreiros (1868–1939), Portuguese journalist, colonialist writer, essayist and poet
 Baltasar Lobo (1910–1993), Spanish artist, anarchist and sculptor
 Cavin Lobo (born 1988), Indian footballer
 Claude Lobo (1943–2011), French car designer
 Cristiana Lôbo (1957–2021), Brazilian journalist
 Cristiana Lobo (swimmer) (born 1972), Brazilian swimmer
 Duarte Lobo (1565–1646), Portuguese composer of the late Renaissance
 Edu Lobo (born 1943), Brazilian singer, guitarist, and composer
 Emerico Lobo de Mesquita (1746–1805), Brazilian composer, music teacher, conductor and organist
 Emiro Lobo (1948–2007), Venezuelan painter, graphic artist and designer
 Erik Lobo (born 1970), known as Mr Lobo, American artist and comedic actor
 Eugenio Gerardo Lobo (1679–1750), Spanish soldier and poet
 Francisco Miranda da Costa Lobo (1864–1945), Portuguese astronomer, pioneer of spectrography
 Francisco Rodrigues Lobo (1580–1622), Portuguese poet and bucolic writer
 Ignatius P. Lobo (1919–2010), Indian prelate of the Catholic Church
 Ildo Lobo (1953–2004), Cape Verdean singer
 Jerónimo Lobo (1593–1678), Portuguese Jesuit missionary
 Julio Lobo (1898–1983), Cuban sugar trader and financier
 Leonard D. Lobo, former headmaster of St Columba's School, Delhi, India
 Luis Lobo (born 1970), Argentine professional tennis player
 Mario Humberto Lobo (born 1964), Argentine former footballer
 Mary Kay Lobo (born 1975), American psychiatric neuroscientist
 Michael Lobo (born 1953), Indian Catholic scientist and genealogist
 Michael Lobo (politician) (born 1976), Indian politician 
 Nahuel Lobo (born 1991), Argentine rugby union footballer
 Pedro Lobo (born 1954), Brazilian photographer
 Porfirio Lobo Sosa (born 1947), President of Honduras
 Rebecca Lobo (born 1973), American television basketball analyst and former professional basketball player
 Ricardo Lobo (born 1984), Brazilian football striker
 Rogerio Hyndman Lobo (born 1923), Macanese businessman
 Rogerio Lobo (boxer) (1971–2006), Brazilian professional boxer
 Sascha Lobo (born 1975), German blogger, writer, journalist and copywriter
 Stephen Lobo (born 1973), Canadian actor

Portuguese-language surnames
Spanish-language surnames
Surnames from nicknames